The Fontana Herald News is a weekly newspaper in Fontana, San Bernardino County, California, founded in 1923 as the Fontana Herald by Cornelius DeBakcsy and in 1944 as the Fontana News by J. Clifton Toney and Vernon Paine. It is now owned by Century Group Newspapers.

Herald founding and growth

The Herald was established as a weekly on June 7, 1923, by Cornelius DeBakcsy when Fontana had fewer than five hundred  residents.

In July, 1931, the newspaper moved into a building formerly occupied by a justice of the peace and two businesses, preparatory to extensive remodeling to accommodate a new printing press. The new plant was dedicated with a banquet where Senator Samuel M. Shortridge was the featured speaker, and other speakers were to be R.C. Harbison, editor of the San Bernardino Sun, Justus Craemer of the National Editorial Association, John B. Long of the California Newspaper Publishers Association and Burton L. Smith of the Los Angeles Times.  Film star Bela Lugosi also spoke.

DeBakcsy biography

In Europe
DeBakcsy was born on May 23, 1880. His father's surname was Debakcsy and his mother's birth name was Ashner.

DeBakcsy said he entered journalism in 1899 or 1901, when he began to write for a weekly newspaper in Hungary.

He said he was the first to file a story concerning the murder of King Alexander and Queen Draga of Serbia in 1903, being the only foreign correspondent there. Later he worked with Ahmed Pasha, the head of the Young Turks after Abdul Hamid, the last Turkish Sultan, was overthrown, and he covered the Balkan War as a correspondent. He also said that in 1904 he was editor and publisher of the official newspaper of the Hungarian government, and in 1905 he established the first news service between the Balkan states and Western Europe.

In 1913, he said, his political party lost power in Hungary, and he was ousted as editor of its newspaper.

In the United States
DeBakcsy came to the United States on tour and became the Hungarian press representative in the Panama–Pacific International Exposition of 1915.

In 1915 he was named associate editor of Szabadsag (Liberty), a Hungarian-language newspaper in Cleveland, Ohio, after he was prevented by the outbreak of war from returning home while he was visiting his brother, Charles G. DeBakcsy in Portland, Oregon.

He moved to the San Fernando Valley in 1920, where he had a "poultry project," and then the same year he moved to Fontana and became associated with A.B. Miller, founder of the community.

DeBakcsky was secretary of the Fontana Chamber of Commerce for ten years in the 1930s.

In February 1935, DeBakcsy spoke to the Arcadia, California, Rotary Club, saying that there were more communists in America than there were in Russia at the time of the Russian Revolution in 1917. In January 1938 he warned that "communists and communist sympathizers would undermine" the United States.

In September of the same year, DeBakcsy was chairman of a committee which dedicated a tree in the San Sevaine flats, west of Lytle Creek Canyon in honor of San Bernardino County Supervisor J.E Elliott, noted forester.

In 1936, DeBakcsy and his wife, Gizella, were registered as Republicans in San Bernardino County. In 1937 he was president of the San Bernardino County Chamber of Commerce,  of which he was one of the organizers.

DeBakcsy was president of the 28th Agricultural District in California, beginning in 1938.

DeBakcsy was honored on August 26, 1939, with a dinner-tribute in Fontana on his 40th anniversary in the newspaper business. Present were former Governors Friend W. Richardson and Frank F. Merriam.

He died in his home on September 16, 1947, leaving his widow and a son, Alex, who was business manager of the Herald.

Legacy

A bas-relief plaque of DeBakcsy was presented to the Fontana Women's Club by artist Yucca Salamunich on January 26, 1948. It was unveiled by retired film actress Betty Blythe Scardon.

News founding and growth

The Fontana News began publication on November 30, 1944, with J. Clifton Toney as editor and co-owner with Vernon Paine, publisher of the Upland News. In October 1946 Toney bought Paine's interest and established a plant for the newspaper in Fontana.

Merger and later ownership

The Herald, at that time a semiweekly publication, was purchased by Robert K. Hancock, former publisher of the Santa Maria Times, from Alex DeBakcsy in June 1948. The Herald and the News were merged effective August 1, 1948.

In 1952 the newspaper was sold to Mynatt Smith and Wilbur Mackey of McAllen, Texas.

George Riggs was the publisher in 1977 and in 1984. In the latter year, the newspaper was published five days a week, with a circulation of 8,000. It had been purchased by Buckner News Alliance, a Seattle, Washington-based chain of eight dailies, in 1967.

In June 1989 the newspaper was bought by the Riverside Press-Enterprise. Tim Hays, the P-E's editor and chairman, later said the Herald-News had been "sick" and losing money for years.

In November 1990 the newspaper announced it would cease publishing on November 9. Hays said it had a circulation of 2,500, which made it the fourth-smallest among 113 daily California newspapers, employing 24 full-time and 10 part-time workers, and that it was financially unsuccessful.

The newspaper was, however, rescued when it was purchased by Century Group Newspapers, which had plans of reviving it by focusing its content "100 percent" on local news, said Gerald Bean, head of the group.

In 2020 the newspaper had a weekly circulation of 14,381, Century's website reported.

References

Weekly newspapers published in California